, the regions of Tajikistan are subdivided into 47 districts (nohiya or , rayon), not including 4 districts belonging to the capital city Dushanbe, and 18 cities of regional subordination (including Dushanbe, an extraregional capital city). Before ca. 2017, there were 58 districts. The districts are further subdivided into rural municipalities called jamoats, which in turn are further subdivided into villages (or deha or qyshloq).

The numbering of the districts follows the map.

Sughd Region

Districts:

Cities of regional subordination:

Areas of Republican Subordination

Districts:

Cities of regional subordination:

City districts of Dushanbe

Khatlon Region

Districts:

Cities of regional subordination:

Gorno-Badakhshan Autonomous Region

Districts:

City of regional subordination:

References

 
Subdivisions of Tajikistan
Tajikistan, Districts
Tajikistan 2
Districts, Tajikistan
Tajikistan geography-related lists